The 2014–15 season was Zrinjski Mostar’s the 23rd season after reforming and their 15th in the Premier League of BiH.

First-team squad

Friendlies

Competitions

Overall

Premier League of BiH

League table

Results summary

Results by round

Matches

Cup of BiH

UEFA Champions League

Second qualifying round

Transfers

In

Out

References

2014-15
2014–15 UEFA Champions League participants seasons
Zrinjski